The Loreto Province is one of the eight provinces in the Loreto Region of Peru. The capital of the province is the historic town of Nauta. This biologically and culturally diverse region includes the Pacaya–Samiria National Reservation, and is also home to many indigenous peoples, (such as the Cocama, Omagua, Iquito people and Urarina), as well as peasants (ribereños) who live off the land and aquatically rich rivers.

Political division
The province is divided into five districts.

 Nauta (Nauta)
 Parinari (Parinari)
 Tigre (Intutu)
 Trompeteros (Villa Trompeteros)
 Urarinas (Concordia)

Places of interest
 Pucacuro Reserved Zone

Provinces of the Loreto Region